"The Nightman Cometh" is the thirteenth and final episode of It's Always Sunny in Philadelphia’s fourth season. The episode features a rock opera based on songs written by 
Charlie Kelly. The episode was later adapted into a short-lived stage musical in 2009.

Plot 
With a spring in his step, Charlie notifies the gang that he's written a musical. Dennis and Mac quiz Charlie over his motivations, but the gang want to play the parts that Charlie has written for them purely out of their own vanity.

Since he is functionally illiterate, Charlie enlists the help of Dee's friend Artemis to transcribe the script into something legible. The gang squabble over which parts to play. Initially, Mac is excited to play The Dayman, but Dennis goads him into trading parts. Frank is cast as the troll and Dee is picked to play the princess.

Dee is concerned over the subject matter of her song's lyrics, contending they sound like she molests children. Charlie also tries in vain to get Frank to say "boy's soul" rather than "boy's hole" in his song.

Charlie tracks down The Waitress, giving her a ticket and telling her that he will never bother her again if she attends.

On the night of the show, the gang is excited to perform for an audience. However, some drama ensues when Dee ad-libs a song clarifying that she's not interested in children, much to Charlie's chagrin. Mac gets laughs when he comes on stage as The Nightman, much to his dismay.

The Troll sings to The Nightman that he has to pay the Troll Toll to get the boy's soul, although Frank's pronunciation results in him saying "hole" instead of "soul." Mac hops onto Dennis in bed, who points out that Mac has an erection. Dennis transforms into the Dayman and kills the Troll with a handgun. The Dayman fights the Nightman and pulls his heart out. The remaining cast members then join for an ensemble reprise of "Dayman", which Dennis and Charlie came up with in the earlier episode "Sweet Dee's Dating a Retarded Person".

Following "The Dayman" reprise, Charlie swoops down from a sun from above the stage, wearing a yellow outfit, singing "Marry Me" to The Waitress as a wedding proposal to her. This awkward moment reveals his true motivation in penning and putting on an entire musical. Unsurprisingly, Charlie's gambit is all for naught, as she declines his proposal and storms out.

Production
The Dayman was first introduced as a song written by Charlie Kelly and Dennis Reynolds in the ninth episode of the third season, "Sweet Dee's Dating a Retarded Person." Glenn Howerton explained: "Scott Marder and Rob Rosell wrote the episode and the lyrics: 'Dayman, fighter of the Nightman, champion of the sun / He's a master of karate and friendship for everyone.' Which are just the worst fucking lyrics ever, which is exactly what we wanted."

The unexpectedly enthusiastic reception of the Dayman song inspired the cast to devise a musical episode, but one "organic to the tone of the series." One of the initial ideas was the musical being an elaborate prank with a rival bar but that concept was eventually abandoned. "We finally realized: Maybe Charlie writes the musical and our characters are just so fucking vain that we can't stomach the thought of Charlie getting other people to do it," said Howerton. "Any time we deal with that kind of subject matter, I like to think it's coming from a more intelligent place," Charlie Day explained. "A rape joke is not remotely a funny thing; a man writing a musical that he thinks is about self-empowerment, and not realizing that all his lyrics sound like they're about a child being molested, is a funny thing. The joke is coming from confusion and misunderstanding, which are classic tropes of all comedy."

Most of the music in the episode was written by Day and composer Cormac Bluestone. "I said, 'Let me go off and write some of the songs and lyrics,' and I went to the piano," Day said. "We'd already had the Dayman song, so I pulled out the 'Troll Toll' and 'Tiny Boy, Little Boy' songs." The episode was performed in front of background actors who didn't have any context for the musical so their bemused reactions were genuine. Director Matt Shakman told the cast, "Just do it all the way through."

"I got Artemis Pebdani to act like the stage manager of the event and actually come out and do the speech that you always hear in shows about where the fire exits are," Shakman said. "I remember a lot of confused faces as we were performing," Rob McElhenney recalled. "People [who weren't familiar with the show] were wondering why it was funny… But I always go back to Glenn and Charlie; if they're still laughing, then I know it's funny."

Stage adaptation

In September 2009, the cast took their show live. The "Gang" performed the musical The Nightman Cometh in New York City, Boston, Seattle, San Francisco, Los Angeles, and Philadelphia. Mary Elizabeth Ellis and Artemis Pebdani also appeared in the performance as The Waitress and Artemis. Actress Rhea Perlman (wife of Danny DeVito) assumed the role of Gladys.

McElhenney said that Live Nation originally approached the cast about doing the show in 30 cities, but the cast settled on 6. Howerton described the show as "essentially an expanded version of the actual episode of "The Nightman Cometh", which was the final episode for season four. There are some added moments, added scenes, added songs, and extended versions of songs that already existed." Two new songs were included in the performance and a longer running time allowed for greater improvisation by the actors. The performance was also preceded by a preview screening of a season five episode.

The Los Angeles performance, filmed at The Troubadour, was included as a bonus feature on the season four DVD box set.

Trivia 
The title of Charlie's play is a reference to Eugene O'Neill's classic play The Iceman Cometh. O'Neill's play is described as being about "dead-end alcoholics who spend every possible moment seeking oblivion in one another's company and trying to con or wheedle free drinks from Harry and the bartenders", which is a good description of the gang.

References

External links
 

Fictional musicals
It's Always Sunny in Philadelphia episodes
2008 American television episodes
Television episodes directed by Matt Shakman
Musical television episodes